Rayno Garth Arendse (born 8 December 1978) is a South African cricketer who played for Boland and Free State. A right-handed batsman and right-arm medium pace bowler, he made his first-class debut for Boland on 14 March 1998 against a Sri Lankan representative team. He joined Free State in 2001 and spent three seasons with the province before returning to Boland, where he played until 2010.

Arendse also played club cricket for several English sides, assisting Topcroft, Cromer, Vauxhall Mallards and Scarborough.

References
Rayno Arendse profile at CricketArchive

1978 births
Living people
People from Worcester, South Africa
South African cricketers
Boland cricketers
Free State cricketers
Cricketers from the Western Cape